Tar-Suu is a village in the Chüy Region of Kyrgyzstan. Its population was 698 in 2021. Its elevation is 1,544 m (5,066 ft).

References

Populated places in Chüy Region